Francisco José Abascal Alonso (born 10 October 1966), known as Francis Abascal, is a Spanish former professional footballer who played as a centre back.

Career

Abascal was born in Noriega in Ribadedeva, within the province and autonomous community of Asturias, and began his career with Asturian side Real Oviedo. He first appeared for the B team, Real Oviedo Aficionados, in 1984, and helped them to promotion as Tercera División group winners in 1987–88. However, he never played for the first team, and moved on in 1988 to join Real Burgos. He won the Segunda División title with Burgos in 1989–90, but played just once in the ensuing top flight campaign. He left the club in 1991 after 59 appearances and five goals in all competitions, joining La Liga rivals Cádiz.

In Abascal's first season, Cádiz avoided relegation thanks to a playoff victory over Figueres, but they were not so lucky in 1992–93. The following year they suffered a second consecutive relegation, and Abascal departed with two goals in his 75 matches for the club in all competitions. His next destination was San Fernando, where he made 33 appearances in 1994–95, but couldn't prevent them being relegated from Segunda División B. He spent the next two seasons with Langreo in the third tier, scoring once in 69 matches.

Abascal signed for Tercera División side Ponferradina in 1997. He helped them to promotion in 1998–99, and made 29 appearances in the Segunda División B season that followed. He retired in 2000 at the age of 33.

Honours
Real Oviedo Aficionados
Tercera División: 1987–88

Real Burgos
Segunda División: 1989–90

Career statistics

1. Appearances in the 1991–92 La Liga relegation playoff

References

External links

1966 births
Living people
People from Llanes
Spanish footballers
Footballers from Asturias
Association football defenders
La Liga players
Segunda División players
Segunda División B players
Tercera División players
Real Oviedo Vetusta players
Real Burgos CF footballers
Cádiz CF players
CD San Fernando players
UP Langreo footballers
SD Ponferradina players